Middenschouwen is a former municipality in the Dutch province of Zeeland. It covered the central part of the island of Schouwen-Duiveland.

Middenschouwen was created in a merger of Duivendijke, Elkerzee, Ellemeet and Kerkwerve in 1961. It existed until 1997, when it was merged into the new municipality of Schouwen-Duiveland.

References

States and territories established in 1961
1961 establishments in the Netherlands
Municipalities of the Netherlands disestablished in 1997
Former municipalities of Zeeland
History of Schouwen-Duiveland